Colombo Fashion Week (CFW), is a semiannual fashion show held in Colombo, Sri Lanka, with spring/summer (February – March) and Swim Wear in autumn (September – October); Swim Week Colombo. It was created in 2003 by Ajai Vir Singh. It is organised by CFW Holdings and sponsored by HSBC.

It is known for being one of the few fashion weeks in Asia that has lasted over ten years. It aims to serve as a hub for South Asian fashion. Where designers from neighbouring countries like Pakistan, Bangladesh and India take part.

Locations
CFW has been held at the Hilton Colombo for most of its lifespan. More recently it was held at Shangri-La Colombo, and also Port City Colombo.

Swim Week Colombo
Swim Week Colombo is the first and most premiere platform in Asia for swimwear fashion,  facilitating a responsible ecosystem from Manufacturing, to Designing to Retail.
Presenting Sri Lanka's best swimwear designers; regional and international, and promoting fusion with local crafts. It is sponsored by OLU Water.

It also seeks to facilitate a global platform for swimwear, thereby positioning Sri Lanka as swimwear capital of the world. Promoting Sri Lanka as a high-quality production destination, as Sri Lanka has some of the worlds best production facilities.

Attendance
Admission to shows at Colombo Fashion week is by invitation only, with specific events included.

Awards
CFW gives three awards; Lifetime Achievement Award, Gen-Next award and the Face of CFW award to deserving individuals.

See also
Fashion week
List of fashion events
List of fashion designers

References 

Fashion events in Sri Lanka
Annual events in Sri Lanka
Recurring events established in 2003
Events in Colombo
Fashion weeks
Fashion by nationality
Fashion
Sri Lankan fashion